

England & Wales
A Crime and Disorder Reduction Partnership (CDRP) is one of a number of statutory local partnerships in England and Wales, and was established by the Crime and Disorder Act 1998 to co-ordinate action on crime and disorder.

Wales
In Wales, CDRPs are called Community Safety Partnerships.

CDRP partners include the police, local authorities, probation service, health authorities, social landlords, the voluntary sector, and local residents and businesses.

External links 
Partnerships mini-site Government web site

Law enforcement in the United Kingdom